Hänt Bild is a celebrity magazine published in Stockholm, Sweden. The magazine was started in 2003. It is part of Aller Media AB. It is published on a weekly basis.

References

External links

2003 establishments in Sweden
Celebrity magazines
Magazines established in 2003
Magazines published in Stockholm
Swedish-language magazines
Weekly magazines published in Sweden